Adrian Toader (born 24 May 1972) is a Romanian modern pentathlete. He competed in the men's individual event at the 1996 Summer Olympics.

References

1972 births
Living people
Romanian male modern pentathletes
Olympic modern pentathletes of Romania
Modern pentathletes at the 1996 Summer Olympics
Place of birth missing (living people)